Stump Cross Caverns is a limestone cave system between Wharfedale and Nidderdale in North Yorkshire, England.

Geography
Their name was taken from Stump Cross, which in ancient times marked the limit of Knaresborough Forest. The area above the caves consists largely of moorland, the nearest towns being Pateley Bridge and Grassington. It has not yet been fully explored.  

The system is located in a region of limestone extending from Wharfedale to Greenhow and the Craven Fault. Lead has been mined in the region since the era of the Roman empire.

History
The caves are thought to have been formed around 500,000 years ago, although the process by which they were created began during a much earlier period in which the region was covered by ocean. They were discovered in January 1860 by William and Mark Newbould, who were amongst a group of miners prospecting for lead veins in the Yorkshire Dales. Some sources have given the date of their discovery as 1858. By 1867  of the caves had been explored. 

In 1922 the caves were explored more thoroughly by Christopher Long, a student at Caius College, Cambridge. His discoveries included stalactites in a range of colours, suggesting that they were impregnated with iron and lead. Long claimed that he had also discovered an underground lake, but is said to have sealed its entrance when the caves' owners refused to allow him a share of the revenue generated by tourism to the site.

The caverns were sold in 1926 to Septimus Wray, the owner of the Heysham Head Pleasure Gardens, for £400, who installed his son in law, Harry Deane Hornby to run them on his behalf. Septimus Wray's grandson, George Gill later took over the running of the caves, and installed electric lighting, and started to promote the caves as a tourist attraction with the caves remaining in his family until 2003. In 1963 Geoffrey Workman spent 105 days in the caves, a world record, as part of a study on the effects of isolation on the body. Stump Cross developed into a tourist destination in the decades that followed, gaining an information centre, gift shop and a two-bedroomed cottage for the owners.

The caves gained Site of Special Scientific Interest designation, and the Reindeer Cave was opened to the public in 2000, forty-five years after it was first discovered. In 2001 the caves were affected by the cleanup of nearby farms during the foot-and-mouth crisis. By 2003 over 60,000 people visited the caves every year. In the same year they were put on the market by then-owner Gordon Hanley, a son of George Gill's second wife, for £675,000.

Ownership of the site passed to the Bowerman family, who also part-own the Richmond Brewery Company, which in 2008 released an ale named after Stump Cross.

Fossils
Several fossils have been discovered in the Stump Cross system. The initial discoverers of the caves found four near-complete reindeer fossils and a smaller skeleton believed to be that of an unborn reindeer. These have since been privately restored. Christoper Long's 1922 exploration revealed more prehistoric reindeer bones, and also those of wolverines. The wolverine bones are now on display at the site's visitor centre. Bison remains have also been found.

References

External links

Stump Cross Caverns website

Show caves in the United Kingdom
Nidderdale
Caves of North Yorkshire
Sites of Special Scientific Interest in North Yorkshire